Natalia Wörner (born 7 September 1967) is a German actress.

Biography 
After finishing high school in Stuttgart, Wörner moved to New York City, where she studied acting at Lee Strasberg's Actors Studio. In 2000, she returned to Germany, where she won a German television award, the Deutscher Fernsehpreis, for best leading actress. She served on the award’s jury in 2001 and 2002.

In 2009, Wörner played the role of Ellen in the TV miniseries The Pillars of the Earth, based on the eponymous book by Ken Follett. In 2012, she was given the role of Rebecca Kendall as one of the "other wives" in Rosamunde Pilcher's The Other Wife.

In addition to her acting career, Wörner has been a goodwill ambassador for German charity Kindernothilfe since 2006. She also served as ambassador of a 2010/2011 Pink Ribbon campaign in Germany. In 2015, Wörner accompanied Foreign Minister Frank-Walter Steinmeier on an official trip to South Korea and Indonesia. She later was a SPD delegate to the Federal Convention for the purpose of electing the President of Germany in 2017.

Filmography 

 1992: Glück 1
 1992: Thea und Nat
 1994: Leni
 1994: Die Maschine
 1994: Women Are Simply Wonderful
 1994: 
 1995: Der Elefant vergisst nie
 1995: Kinder der Nacht
 1996: Father's Day
 1996: Tatort (episode: "Perfect Mind – Im Labyrinth")
 1997: Spiel um dein Leben
 1998: Zur Zeit zu zweit
 1998: 
 1998: Mammamia
 1998: Der Handymörder
 1999: Zum Sterben schön
 1999: Der Feuerteufel – Flammen des Todes
 1999: Das Tal der Schatten
 1999: Tatort (episode: "Martinsfeuer")
 2000: Frauen lügen besser
 2001: Klassentreffen – Mord unter Freunden
 2001: Verbotene Küsse
 2002: Der Seerosenteich
 2003: Wenn Weihnachten wahr wird
 2003: Love and Desire
 2004: Experiment Bootcamp
 2004: Für immer im Herzen
 2005: Miss Texas
 2005: Das Geheimnis des Roten Hauses
 2006: 20 Nächte und ein Regentag
 2006: 
 2006: Der beste Lehrer der Welt
 2006–2010: Unter anderen Umständen (series, 6 episodes)
 2007: Durch Himmel und Hölle
 2008: Die Lüge
 2009: Mein Mann, seine Geliebte und ich
 2009: Rosamunde Pilcher – Vier Jahreszeiten
 2010: The Pillars of the Earth
 2011: Cenerentola
 2012: The Other Wife
 2014: 
 2015: Tannbach
 2017: Berlin Station

Awards 
 1996: Golden Gong
 2000: Deutscher Fernsehpreis
 2011: Romy for The Pillars of the Earth (Die Säulen der Erde) 
 2016: Order of Merit of the Federal Republic of Germany

References

External links 
 
 
 Prisma.de with current TV notes
 Biography at moviesection.de (2010)

1967 births
Living people
20th-century German actresses
21st-century German actresses
Actors Studio alumni
Actresses from Stuttgart
German film actresses
German television actresses
Recipients of the Cross of the Order of Merit of the Federal Republic of Germany